Fucking Awesome is an American skateboard company and streetwear brand. Due to the profanity in the brand's name, it is often referred to as simply "FA." FA was created by professional skateboarders Jason Dill and Anthony Van Engelen. FA has created collaborations with brands like Vans, Adidas, and Independent Trucks.

FA has a sister brand called "Hockey." FA is close with Hockey and the brand often releases video parts using both sets of teams.

Team 
FA currently harbors two skate teams, Fucking Awesome and Hockey.

FA roster:

 Jason Dill
Anthony Van Engelen
 Kevin Bradley
 Gino Iannucci
 Kevin Terpening
Sage Elsesser
 Sean Pablo
 Elijah Berle
 Aidan Mackey
Louie Lopez
 Vincent Touzery
 Beatrice Domond

Hockey roster:

 Donovon Piscopo
 John Fitzgerald
 Ben Kadow
 Andrew Allen
 Caleb Barnett
 Diego Todd
 Kevin Rodrigues
 Nik Stain
 Joseph Campos

Past Members:

 Dylan Rieder (deceased)
 Tyshawn Jones
 Na-Kel Smith

Store 
In 2019, FA opened their first physical location in Los Angeles, on Hollywood Boulevard. They opened their second location in 2021, in Lower Manhattan, New York City.

Dylan Rieder 
Dylan Rieder was a former team member who battled cancer for two years, he ended up passing due to complications with leukemia. He is frequently memorialized in FA's products.

Videos 
FA has released four skateboarding videos titled: Hockey, Hockey II, Hockey III and Dancing on Thin Ice.

Adidas 
FA has collaborated with Adidas twice so far. Having 4 shoes in total for sale.

References

Skateboarding companies